Xinzheng International Airport is a metro station on Chengjiao line and Zhengxu line of Zhengzhou Metro. The station is located with the ground traffic center (GTC) of Zhengzhou Xinzheng International Airport and provides airport rail link services to downtown Zhengzhou.

The roof of the concourse is wave-shaped, resembling the roof of the Terminal 1 of Zhengzhou Xinzheng International Airport.

Station layout 
The station has 2 levels underground. The B2 level is for the entrances/exits and the concourse. A single island platform is on the B3 level.

Exits

References 

Stations of Zhengzhou Metro
Chengjiao line, Zhengzhou Metro
Railway stations in China opened in 2017
Airport railway stations in China